Atila Kasaš (born 21 September 1968) is a Serbian football manager and former player of Hungarian descent.

Playing career
Kasaš made his Yugoslav First League debut with Vojvodina in the 1985–86 season, appearing in five games, as the club suffered relegation. He later made a name for himself at Bečej, helping them to a double promotion to reach the top flight in 1992. After scoring 20 goals in the 1993–94 First League of FR Yugoslavia, Kasaš moved abroad to Spanish club Logroñés. He also briefly played for Hungarian side BVSC, before returning to Bečej.

Managerial career
Kasaš served as manager of Bečej between October 2014 and May 2015.

References

External links
 
 
 

1968 births
Living people
People from Bečej
Yugoslav people of Hungarian descent
Serbian people of Hungarian descent
Yugoslav footballers
Serbia and Montenegro footballers
Serbian footballers
Association football forwards
FK Vojvodina players
OFK Bečej 1918 players
CD Logroñés footballers
Budapesti VSC footballers
Yugoslav First League players
Yugoslav Second League players
First League of Serbia and Montenegro players
La Liga players
Nemzeti Bajnokság I players
Serbia and Montenegro expatriate footballers
Expatriate footballers in Spain
Expatriate footballers in Hungary
Serbia and Montenegro expatriate sportspeople in Spain
Serbia and Montenegro expatriate sportspeople in Hungary
Serbian football managers
FK Bečej managers